The 2005 European Championship of American football was hosted by Sweden between 28 July to 30 July 2005. The tournament was played between the three nations from the A-pool and the champion from B-pool played on 2004. The tournament had round-robin qualification. The two top teams won the qualification for the 2007 IFAF World Championship.

Teams

 (2001 champion)
 (2001 Runner-up)
 (Host)
 (2004 B-Pool Winner)

Games

Semifinal

3rd Place

1st Place

All Star Team

Head Coach of the tournament:  Kristian Thore

Defensive MVP of the tournament:  R Biro #25 CB

Offensive MVP of the tournament:  J Ullrich #12 QB

MVP of the tournament:  CJ Björk #36 MLB

First team selections

Offense

Defense

Special teams

References

External links
 Europeans Championship

European Championship of American football
2005 in American football
2005 in Swedish sport
International sports competitions hosted by Sweden
American football in Sweden
International sports competitions in Malmö
July 2005 sports events in Europe
2000s in Malmö